The following elections occurred in the year 1914.

Africa
 1914 Southern Rhodesian Legislative Council election

Asia
 1914 Persian legislative election

Europe
 1914 French legislative election
 1914 Papal conclave
 March 1914 Swedish general election
 September 1914 Swedish general election

North America

Canada
 1914 Edmonton municipal election
 1914 Manitoba general election
 1914 Ontario general election
 1914 Toronto municipal election

United States
 United States House of Representatives elections in California, 1914
 1914 California gubernatorial election
 1914 Minnesota gubernatorial election
 1914 New York state election
 United States Senate election in Pennsylvania, 1914
 United States House of Representatives elections in South Carolina, 1914
 United States Senate election in South Carolina, 1914
 1914 South Carolina gubernatorial election
 1914 United States House of Representatives elections
 1914 United States Senate elections

United States Senate
 United States Senate election in Pennsylvania, 1914
 United States Senate election in South Carolina, 1914
 1914 United States Senate elections

South America
 1914 Argentine legislative election
 1914 Brazilian presidential election

Oceania

Australia
 1914 Adelaide by-election
 1914 Australian federal election
 1914 Western Australian state election

New Zealand
 1914 New Zealand general election

See also
 :Category:1914 elections

1914
Elections